Egypt Kids is an educational video game, released in 2001 for Windows-based PCs. It was developed by EMG and published by Cryo Interactive under the Cryo Kids brand. The game was made in association with Réunion des Musées Nationaux. The Russian version was localised by Nival Interactive. The game is available in English, French, Italian, German, Spanish, and Polish.

Development
This was Cryo, the Louvre and the Réunion des musées nationaux's third collaboration after Egypt and Egypt II.

Plot 
The game is set in Heliopolis, a city located on the banks of the River Nile, in Ancient Egypt. The player solves mysteries to learn about subjects like life in Egypt and the Egyptian Gods. Dragoo, a mischievous young dragon, is the player's guide through the game. The game also includes an Ancient Egypt multimedia encyclopaedia.

Gameplay 
The game consists of many interactive and educational workshops, each revolving around a theme such as architecture, hieroglyphs, religion, and music.

Critical reception 

Olaf Szewczyk of Polygamia thought the game offered a pale representation of the interesting Egyptian culture.

See also 
 Egypt: 1156 B.C.: Tomb of the Pharaoh
 Egypt 2: The Heliopolis Prophecy
 Egypt 3: The Egyptian Prophecy

References

External links 
 Egypte Kids at Microïds
 Website

2001 video games
Adventure games
Children's educational video games
Cryo Interactive games
Europe-exclusive video games
Microïds games
Video games developed in France
Video games set in Egypt
Windows games
Windows-only games